Raoiella indica, commonly known as the red palm mite, is a species of mite belonging to the family Tenuipalpidae. A pest of several species of palm in the Middle East and South East Asia, it is now becoming established throughout the Caribbean. The invasion of this species is the biggest mite explosion ever observed in the Americas.

Distribution
This species is indigenous to Egypt, India, Iran, Israel, Mauritius, Oman, Pakistan, Philippines, Réunion, Saudi Arabia, Sri Lanka, Sudan, Thailand and the United Arab Emirates.

It is considered an invasive species in Dominican Republic, Guadeloupe, Puerto Rico, Saint Martin, Trinidad and Tobago, the US Virgin Islands, Grenada, Haiti and Jamaica.

In 2007, the red palm mite was discovered in Florida. As of April, 2009, this pest has been found at almost 400 sites in five counties there.

Description

This species can be distinguished from most other mites by its colour, flat body, long spatulate setae, and droplets on the dorsal body setae. There is also a noticeable absence of the webbing associated with numerous other spider mites.

The red palm mite has a long, bright red, spatulate body. During all stages of life, this species is red, with adult females often showing black patches on their backs after feeding.

Red palm mite eggs are 0.12 mm long and 0.09 wide. The eggs are smooth and can be found in groups attached to the underside of leaves.

Larvae are 0.18–.020 mm in length and only have three pairs of legs. Nymphs are 0.18–0.25 mm long.

Adults are approximately 0.32 mm long. Females are larger than males and have a triangular body.

Life cycle
The egg stage ranges from 6 to 9 days. Development from egg to adult ranges from 23 to 28 days for females, and 20 to 22 days for males. The red palm mite lives for about 26 days.

Hosts
This mite has been found on 32 different palm species. In the Caribbean, this species also infests banana plants, heliconias and gingers.

Survey, detection and damage

The red palm mite forms colonies on the undersides of leaves. There, they feed on the contents of the cells of the leaves. This feeding can cause localized yellowing of the leaves.

Adults are usually visible to the naked eye.

Dispersal
Like most other plant feeding mites, this species disperses on the wind. Tropical storms and hurricanes can distribute this mite over wide areas.

Management

Chemical control is considered impractical due to the large size of most palms. Some biological control agents have proven useful in the Eastern Hemisphere, including predatory mites, beetles, lacewings and other mite predators.

See also
 Invasive species
 Parasite

Notes

References

Further reading
  CariPestNet. 2006. Raoiella indica Hirst (Red Palm Mite)
 Etienne, J. and C.H.W. Flechtmann. 2006. First record of Raoiella indica (Hirst, 1924) (Acari: Tenuipalpidae) in Guadeloupe and Saint Martin, West Indies. International Journal of Acarology, 32(3): 331–332.
 Flechtmann, C.H.W. and J. Etienne. 2004. The red palm mite, Raoiella indica Hirst, a threat to palms in the Americas (Acari: Prostigmata: Tenuipalpidae). Systematic & Applied Acarology, 9: 109–110.
 Flechtmann, C.H.W. and J. Etienne. 2005. Un nouvel acarien ravageur des palmiers. Phytoma 584: 10–11.
 Gerson, U., A. Venezian & D. Blumberg. 1983. Phytophagous mites on date palms in Israel. Fruits, 38(2),133–135.
 Gutiérrez, B., N. Nohelia & A. Garcia. 2007. Situación actual del cocotero in al municipio Valdez del estado Sucre.
 Hirst, S. 1924. On some new species of red spider. Annals and Magazine of Natural History, Set. 9, vol. 14: 522–527.
 Hoy, M.A., J. Peña and R. Nguyen. 2006. Red palm mite, Raoiella indica Hirst (Arácnida: Acari: Tenuipalpidae). University of Florida IFAS Extension.
 Kane, E.C., R. Ochoa, G. Mathurin, and E.F. Erbe. 2005. indica-Kane_et_al.pdf Raoiella indica Hirst (Acari: Tenuipalpidae): An island-hopping mite pest in the Caribbean. Entomological Society of America, Annual Meeting, Florida poster.
 Kane, E., and R. Ochoa. 2006. Detection and identification of the red palm mite Raoiella indica Hirst (Acari: Tenuipalpidae). USDA, ARS, Beltsville, MD, 6 pp. 
 Mendonga, R.S., D. Navia, and C.H.W. Flechtmann. 2006. Raoiella indica Hirst (Prostigmata: Tenuipalpidae), o ácaro vermelho das palmeiras - uma ameaça para as Américas. Brasilia: Embrapa Recursos Geneticos e Biotecnologia (Portuguese).
 Nageshachandra, B.K. and G.P. Channabasavanna. 1984. Development and ecology of Raoiella indica Hirst (Acari: Tenuipalpidae) on coconut. Griffiths, D. A. & Bowman, C.E. (eds.), Acarology VI. 2: 785–790.
 Pena, J.E., C.M. Mannion, F.W. Howard and M.A. Hoy. 2006. Raoiella indica (Prostigmata: Tenuipalpidae): The red palm mite: A potential invasive pest of palms and Bananas and other tropical crops in Florida. University of Florida IFAS Extension, ENY-837.
 Rodrigues, J. C.V., R. Ochoa and E. Kane. 2007. First report of Raoiella indica Hirst (Acari: Tenuipalpidae) and its damage to coconut palms in Puerto Rico and Culebra Islands. International Journal of Acarology, 33(1): 3–5.
 Florida Department of Agriculture red palm mite updates

External links

Trombidiformes
Animals described in 1924
Arachnids of Asia